Atlapetes is a genus of birds in the New World sparrow family Passerellidae. The species are mainly found in montane forest from Mexico to northwestern Argentina.

Taxonomy and species
The genus Atlapetes was introduced in 1831 by the German naturalist Johann Georg Wagler to accommodate the rufous-capped brushfinch (Atlapetes pileatus). The genus name is from Ancient Greek and combines the name of the mythical figure Atlas with petēs, meaning "flyer". Within the New World sparrow family Passerellidae the genus Atlapetes is sister to the genus Pipilo.

The genus contains 33 species:

 Rufous-capped brushfinch, Atlapetes pileatus
 Moustached brushfinch, Atlapetes albofrenatus
 Merida brushfinch, Atlapetes meridae
 Ochre-breasted brushfinch, Atlapetes semirufus
 Tepui brushfinch, Atlapetes personatus
 White-naped brushfinch, Atlapetes albinucha
 Santa Marta brushfinch, Atlapetes melanocephalus
 Pale-naped brushfinch, Atlapetes pallidinucha
 Yellow-headed brushfinch, Atlapetes flaviceps
 Dusky-headed brushfinch, Atlapetes fuscoolivaceus
 Choco brushfinch, Atlapetes crassus
 Tricolored brushfinch, Atlapetes tricolor
 White-rimmed brushfinch, Atlapetes leucopis
 Yellow-thighed brushfinch, Atlapetes tibialis
 Yellow-green brushfinch, Atlapetes luteoviridis
 Yellow-breasted brushfinch, Atlapetes latinuchus
 Black-fronted brushfinch, Atlapetes nigifrons
 Antioquia brushfinch, Atlapetes blancae
 Rufous-eared brushfinch, Atlapetes rufigenis
 Apurímac brushfinch, Atlapetes forbesi
 Black-spectacled brushfinch, Atlapetes melanopsis
 Slaty brushfinch, Atlapetes schistaceus
 White-winged brushfinch, Atlapetes leucopterus
 White-headed brushfinch, Atlapetes albiceps
 Pale-headed brushfinch, Atlapetes pallidiceps
 Bay-crowned brushfinch, Atlapetes seebohmi
 Rusty-bellied brushfinch, Atlapetes nationi
 Cuzco brushfinch, Atlapetes canigenis
 Vilcabamba brushfinch, Atlapetes terborghi
 Grey-eared brushfinch, Atlapetes melanolaemus
 Bolivian brushfinch, Atlapetes rufinucha
 Fulvous-headed brushfinch, Atlapetes fulviceps
 Yellow-striped brushfinch, Atlapetes citrinellus

References

 
Bird genera
Taxonomy articles created by Polbot
Taxa named by Johann Georg Wagler